Frederick George  may refer to:

 J. Frederick George, a pseudonym of author George Jewsbury
 Frederick Charles George, the full name of the footballer Charlie George

See also